Bolton Swings Sinatra: The Second Time Around is an album by Michael Bolton. Bolton records songs originally made notable by Frank Sinatra.

The album debuted at #51 and constitutes another minor and brief comeback for Bolton, with about 200,000 copies in the US and less than 300,000 copies worldwide.

Track listing
 "You Go to My Head" (J. Fred Coots, Haven Gillespie) – 4:03
 "Fly Me to the Moon" (Bart Howard) – 2:58
 "For Once in My Life" (Ron Miller, Orlando Burden) – 3:20
 "Summer Wind" (Hans Bradtke, Henry Mayer, Johnny Mercer) – 2:34
 "My Funny Valentine" (Lorenz Hart, Richard Rodgers) – 3:52
 "I've Got You Under My Skin" (Cole Porter) – 3:31
 "That's Life" (Kelly Gordon, Dean Kay) – 3:17
 "The Second Time Around" - duet with Nicollette Sheridan (Sammy Cahn, Jimmy Van Heusen) – 4:03
 "The Girl from Ipanema" (Vinicius de Moraes, Norman Gimbel, Antonio Carlos Jobim) – 3:12
 "Night and Day" (Porter) – 4:01
 "They Can't Take That Away From Me" (George Gershwin, Ira Gershwin) – 3:10
 "Theme from New York, New York" (John Kander, Fred Ebb) – 2:28

References

2006 albums
Michael Bolton albums
Frank Sinatra tribute albums
Traditional pop albums